Aliabad-e Shahid (also Romanized as ‘Alīābād-e Shahīd; also known as ‘Alīābād, ‘Alīābād-e Vazīr, and Ali Abad Vazir) is a village in Sharifabad Rural District, Koshkuiyeh District, Rafsanjan County, Kerman Province, Iran. At the 2006 census, its population was 1,042, in 247 families.

References 

Populated places in Rafsanjan County